Michel Dard (1908, Pas-de-Calais – 3 July 1979) was a French writer and winner of the Prix Femina, 1973, for his novel Juan Maldonne.

References 

People from Pas-de-Calais
1908 births
1979 deaths
20th-century French novelists
Prix Femina winners
Prix Valery Larbaud winners
French male novelists
Winners of the Prix Broquette-Gonin (literature)
20th-century French male writers